Samara Felippo Santana (born 6 October 1978) is a Brazilian actress.

Early life 

Samara had originally trained to become a gymnast but decided to study drama in order to overcome her inhibitions. At age 17, she decided against taking competitive exams to major in Computer Science upon being offered a place in the school for actors of the television network Rede Globo.

Career 

She was invited to join Caça Talentos, a children's morning telenovela (televised soap opera) with Angélica. In early 1997, she participated in the Star for a Day segment of the weekly Sunday TV program Domingão do Faustão. Her test was to re-enact a scene in the role of the Nívea Stelmann character in the soap opera A Indomada opposite Matheus Rocha. Her performance was so impressive that it enabled her to participate in other productions of the soap opera broadcast industry.

On her first soap opera, Anjo Mau, Samara played the young Simone Garcia. Later, she appeared on Meu Bem Querer and Suave Veneno, among others. The highlight of her career came in Malhação, where she portrayed the rebellious Érica Schmidt, a character who discovers she has contracted HIV. In 2003, Felippo played the romantic Mariana, in the miniseries A Casa das Sete Mulheres; later that year she portrayed Celina Costa Andrade Fernandes on Chocolate com Pimenta. In 2004 she was cast on the soap opera Da Cor do Pecado, where she showed her comic skills opposite Karina Bacchi and Rosi Campos. In 2005, she played the coquettish Detinha on América. Exploring her comic side, the character of pedestrians trying to conquer the city and find a boyfriend at all costs.

Samara studied cinema at a college in Rio de Janeiro. As to feature films, she performed in the film O Dono do Mar, produced in Maranhão in 2001 and released in 2006. In another film, Concerto Campestre, which was filmed entirely in Pelotas (RS), she had the lead role.

Also very involved with the theater, Samara has performed in several plays during hiatuses from television work. She played in Êxtase (2007); A frente fria que a chuva traz (2006); Comunhão de Bens (2000); O Guarani (1998).

In 2006, she took part in the miniseries JK, playing the role of Maria Estela Kubitschek and she also played the villainesse Wandinha in O Profeta. In 2007, the actress dubbed the role of Colette in the animated film Ratatouille and participated in the TV Globo soap opera Sete Pecados." In 2008, she participated in the reality show Domingão do Faustão, Dança dos Famosos 5. And in the same year she performed in a few episodes of Casos e Acasos, again of TV Globo. She also performed in the theater play Intenções Perigosas.

In 2009, the actress withdrew for a while from soap operas. In 2010, she returned to television to perform in one of the episodes of S.O.S Emergência.

In 2011, she performed in the play Hamlet and in the play Mulheres Alteradas, replacing Adriane Galisteu. In October of that year, she was cast in the miniseries on the life of Dercy Gonçalves which debuted in January 2012 on TV Globo. In the miniseries she had the role of Maria Decimar, daughter of the comedian.

In July 2012, the actress signed with Rede Record. In 2013, the actress was cast as Dinah in the Biblical miniseries José do Egito. In the same year, she returned to the theater in Orgulhosa Demais, Frágil Demais, where she portrayed Marilyn Monroe.

In January 2014, she signed a contract with Globo, and will be in the series O Caçador playing the role of stripper Paulinha Tsunami. In 2015, Samara gave life to Jochebed in the first phase of the novel Os Dez Mandamentos. In 2017, Samara will return the screens in the novel Apocalipse, in which she will play a police officer.

Personal life 
She married basketball player Leandro Barbosa in 2008, and the couple's daughter was born on June 25, 2009. In December 2010, the couple separated, but reconciled again six months later. But, in September 2013, the actress announced their separation again. The actress has a column about the backstage life of NBA basketball in the portal Basketeria.

On May 25, 2013, Samara gave birth to her second daughter.

Filmography

Television

Films

Theater

References

External links 

1978 births
Living people
Actresses from Rio de Janeiro (city)
Brazilian television actresses
Brazilian telenovela actresses
Brazilian film actresses
Brazilian stage actresses
Brazilian voice actresses